Sliver: Music from the Motion Picture is a soundtrack album for the 1993 film Sliver. It peaked at number 23 on the Billboard 200 chart and was certified gold by the RIAA on December 17, 1993.

Track listing

Notes 
 "Oh Carolina" contains the "Peter Gunn Theme" written by Henry Mancini.

Chart history

References

External links 
 

1993 soundtrack albums
Virgin Records soundtracks
1993 compilation albums
Thriller film soundtracks